Dr Evadne Hinge and Dame Hilda Bracket were characters devised by George Logan and Patrick Fyffe for their comedy and musical act. Hinge and Bracket were elderly, intellectual female musicians; in these personae the male Logan and Fyffe played and sang songs to comic effect. They made many appearances on television and radio. The two generally performed together, but on rare occasions appeared separately.

The partnership ended when Patrick Fyffe died of cancer at the age of 60 in 2002.

Characters
Patrick Fyffe and George Logan devised the Hinge and Bracket act after they met performing at the Escort Club in Pimlico, London. Fyffe had already gained experience performing in his cabaret drag act as a glamorous soprano named Perri St Claire, and his character had appeared in small parts on television shows such as Z Cars and Doctor in the House, as well as the 1972 film version of Steptoe and Son.

Fyffe and Logan began to work on a comedy act featuring Fyffe as a retired opera singer who still thinks she can sing, with Logan as her male accompanist. The idea developed into a dual drag act featuring a pair of eccentric old ladies. Their act was distinct from drag queens in that their portrayal was more realistic than exaggerated caricature, allowing them to gain more mainstream appeal beyond gay clubs. Some fans were convinced by their performance and were unaware that the elderly ladies were being acted by two young men, although their act was frequently decorated with double entendres.

Hinge and Bracket were portrayed as a pair of elderly spinsters who had spent their lives performing classical music. They frequently indulged in reminiscences of their heyday singing in opera and performing with Ivor Novello and Noël Coward. Their characters evoked a genteel English inter-war world and their stage act was frequently interspersed with performances of popular songs (often Novello or Coward) and light opera numbers, especially pieces by Gilbert and Sullivan. Both were singers, and Dr Hinge usually provided the accompaniment seated at the piano. Writer Gyles Brandreth described Hinge and Bracket as "a drag act with a difference. They offered character and comedy instead of glamour and sex appeal."

The ladies shared a house (known as The Old Manse or Utopia Ltd) in the fictional village of Stackton Tressel in Suffolk; the name was adapted from Fyffe's Staffordshire birthplace of Acton Trussell. They employed the services of an eccentric housekeeper, Maud, played in the radio series by English character actress Daphne Heard.

Appearances

Hinge and Bracket spent two years in the 1970s performing in London pubs and clubs. This included the Royal Vauxhall Tavern (a popular gay venue), and the Kensington restaurant AD8, owned by Desmond Morgan and April Ashley. After a successful appearance at the 1974 Edinburgh Festival, Hinge and Bracket toured for several years. Among their appearances was a charity gala at the Oxford Playhouse organised by Gyles Brandreth, who later recalled that co-stars of the evening, Dame Peggy Ashcroft and Flora Robson, believed Hinge and Bracket to be two elderly lesbians.

In February 1976, Hinge and Bracket guest starred on the BBC's music hall variety series The Good Old Days and the following year starred in a BBC Radio 4 series, The Enchanting World of Hinge and Bracket, which ran from 1977 to 1979 and included guest stars such as Roy Barraclough, Michael Bates, Daphne Oxenford, Duggie Brown, Joe Gladwin and Roy Plomley. The duo then appeared in a BBC television show entitled Dear Ladies, co-written by Fyffe and Logan with Gyles Brandreth. Set in the fictional village of Stackton Tressel, it was filmed on location in the Cheshire towns of Knutsford, Great Budworth and Nantwich. Dear Ladies ran on BBC2 from 1983 to 1984. Their radio broadcasts continued with The Random Jottings of Hinge and Bracket, which ran on BBC Radio 2 from 1982 to 1989, and a single radio series in 1990, At Home with Hinge and Bracket, which featured a guest star in each episode to perform with the two ladies, including Rosalind Plowright, Anthony Newley, Jack Brymer, June Whitfield, Benjamin Luxon and Evelyn Laye. 

In 1983, Hinge and Bracket appeared in a televised Royal Opera House production of the opera Die Fledermaus. The duo also appeared together in a West End adaptation of Oscar Wilde’s play The Importance of Being Earnest and Peter Shaffer's play Lettice and Lovage, both of which also toured the UK. They made many pantomime appearances, and their act featured on two  Royal Variety Shows. Their act was reputedly a favourite of Queen Elizabeth the Queen Mother. In the early 1980s, Hinge and Bracket appeared in a television advertising campaign for Emva Cream Sherry.

Hinge and Bracket released several LP records. In 1980, they released a studio album, Hinge And Bracket at Abbey Road; its title was intended as a parody of the Beatles' 1969 album, Abbey Road, and Iain Macmillan, the photographer who took the original photograph for the Beatles album cover art, was engaged to photograph Hinge and Bracket striding across the same zebra crossing on Abbey Road in London.

Logan retired the character of Dr Hinge after Fyffe died in 2002, but returned her to the stage for the comic opera The Dowager's Oyster in 2016.

Radio
The Enchanting World of Hinge and Bracket — BBC Radio 4 (1977–1979)
The Random Jottings of Hinge and Bracket  — BBC Radio 2 (1982–1989)
At Home With Hinge and Bracket  — BBC Radio 4 (1990)

Television filmography
At Home with Dr Evadne Hinge and Dame Hilda Bracket (1977)
Hinge and Bracket — (1978-1981)
Dear Ladies  — BBC Two (1983–1985)

Discography
Albums released of Hinge and Bracket include:

Hinge & Bracket – Volume 1 — One-Up (1976)
An Evening with Hinge and Bracket — One-Up (1977)
Hinge and Bracket in Concert — One-Up (1979)
Hinge and Bracket at Abbey Road — EMI (1980)
Hinge and Bracket - Dear Ladies — BBC Records (1983)
Hinge and Bracket - Live in the Park - Stirred Not Shaken — Funny Business (1995)
Hinge and Bracket - (Almost) Live at Stockport — Sonorama

Bibliography

References

External links
Details of their radio shows
Tribute to Patrick Fyffe
Video Tribute to Patrick Fyffe 

Obituary of Patrick Fyffe

 
BBC television sitcoms
BBC Radio comedy programmes
British comedy duos
British drag queens
British male comedians
Rutherglen
British comedy musicians
British male singers
British musical duos
Pantomime dames
British comedy musical groups
Edinburgh Festival performers